Star Ocean: The Divine Force is a 2022 action role-playing game developed by tri-Ace and published by Square Enix. It is the sixth major installment in the Star Ocean series and was released for PlayStation 4, PlayStation 5, Windows, Xbox One, and Xbox Series X/S on October 27. The game's score was composed by series regular Motoi Sakuraba, with character art designed by Akira Yasuda.
The game received mixed to good reception from critics with some praising the combat, characters, and narrative but many felt it was a step-down from a graphical standpoint and some performance inconsistency.

Reception

The PlayStation 4 version of Star Ocean: The Divine Force sold 27,001 physical copies within its first week of release in Japan, making it the third bestselling retail game of the week in the country. The PlayStation 5 version sold 17,177 physical copies in Japan throughout the same week, making it the country's seventh bestselling retail game.

Notes

References

External links

2022 video games
Action role-playing video games
PlayStation 4 games
PlayStation 5 games
Single-player video games
Space opera video games
Square Enix games
Star Ocean
Tri-Ace
Video games developed in Japan
Video games featuring female protagonists
Video games scored by Motoi Sakuraba
Video games set in outer space
Video games set on fictional planets
Windows games
Xbox One games
Xbox Series X and Series S games